The  is a river in Toyama Prefecture, Japan.  in length, it has a watershed of 689 km².

The river rises from Mount Washiba in the Hida Mountains and carves the deep valley known as the Kurobe Gorge. It comes out of the mountains at Unazuki and forms an alluvial fan which directly sinks into the Sea of Japan.

Geography

Tributary 
Kuronagi River

References

External links
The Kurobe River and Pure Water

Rivers of Toyama Prefecture
Toyama (city)
Nyūzen, Toyama
Kurobe, Toyama
Rivers of Japan